R. aureum may refer to:
 Rhododendron aureum, a flowering plant species
 Ribes aureum, the buffalo currant, clove currant, golden currant or Missouri currant, a shrub species native to Canada, most of the United States (except the southeast) and northern Mexico

See also 
 Aureum